Allen Herman Zikmund (March 26, 1922 – January 28, 2018) was an American football player and coach. He served as the head football coach at the University of Nebraska–Kearney–then known as Kearney State College–from 1955 to 1971, compiling a record of 121–31–3. He played college football at the University of Nebraska, lettering from 1940 to 1942. Zikmund was selected by the Chicago Bears in the 1943 NFL Draft.

Head coaching record

College

References

1922 births
2018 deaths
American football halfbacks
Nebraska Cornhuskers football players
Nebraska–Kearney Lopers athletic directors
Nebraska–Kearney Lopers football coaches
High school football coaches in Nebraska
People from Ord, Nebraska
Players of American football from Nebraska